The Tyrrell 010 was a Formula One racing car that was designed by Maurice Philippe for Tyrrell Racing for the  season.

The 010, like all Tyrrells before it was powered by the Ford-Cosworth DFV V8 engine and made its competition debut in the third race of the season in South Africa. The 010s were driven by Frenchman Jean-Pierre Jarier and Irishman Derek Daly, with New Zealander Mike Thackwell driving a third car at the last two races of the season.

Americans Eddie Cheever and Kevin Cogan drove in the season-opening U.S. West Grand Prix, but Cogan was replaced for the next two races by Argentinian Ricardo Zunino, who himself was replaced from Round 4 at Imola by Italian Michele Alboreto. Alboreto who was making his F1 debut and the first of an eventual 194 starts from 215 attempts in Formula One in a career which would see 5 wins, 2 pole positions, 23 podium finishes and runner up in the  World Drivers' Championship while driving for Ferrari.

The 010 was replaced in the middle of the 1981 season by the new 011. The last race for the 010 was the 1981 Austrian Grand Prix where Alboreto qualified 22nd and retired after 40 laps with gearbox failure. The best placings for the 010 were two 4th places: one for Daly in the 1980 British Grand Prix, and another for Cheever at the 1981 British Grand Prix, his last race in the 010 before switching to the 011 in Germany. Tyrrell scored 9 of their 12 points in 1980 and 8 of their 10 points in 1981 with the 010. This car would be the first Tyrrell since the 004 (which was only raced three times by the main team in 1972 and twice more by South African Eddie Keizan in a non-works effort for the 1973 and 1974 South African Grand Prix races) which failed to get a single podium finish and since neither the 009 at the beginning of 1980 (after having obtained a few third place finishes during 1979) nor the 011 at the end of 1981 (which would go on to get a victory with Michele Alboreto in the 1982 Caesers Palace Grand Prix at Las Vegas) allowed Tyrrell a top-three finish during the seasons in question, 1980 and 1981 would be the first and second full seasons from a Tyrrell-built Tyrrell entry without a podium (Tyrrell cars were podiumless in 1970 but were only raced in the last three events while Jackie Stewart won earlier in that season in a Tyrrell-entered March at Jarama, Spain).

Complete Formula One World Championship results
(key) (results in italics indicate fastest lap, results in bold indicate pole position)

* 3 points scored in  using the Tyrrell 009
** 2 points scored in  using the Tyrrell 011

Tyrrell Formula One cars
1981 Formula One season cars